Mahamat Kamoun (born 13 November 1961) is a Central African politician who was the Prime Minister of the Central African Republic, in an interim capacity, from 10 August 2014 to 2 April 2016. He was the country's first Muslim Prime Minister.

Political career
A specialist in finance, Kamoun served as the Director-General of the Treasury under President Francois Bozize. He subsequently served as the head of the cabinet of President Michel Djotodia and was an advisor to interim President Catherine Samba-Panza before his appointment as Prime Minister.

Prime Minister
Kamoun's appointment as Prime Minister sparked discontent and astonishment among the Muslim Séléka rebel group, as the group does not consider Kamoun as a member of Séléka, despite Kamoun being a Muslim. The group subsequently boycotted the National Unity Government as they were not consulted about the choice of Prime Minister, and even threatened to withdraw from the ceasefire agreement signed in Brazzaville in July 2014 as a result of Kamoun's appointment.

He oversaw the December 2015–February 2016 presidential election, saying "The warlords will have to accept the results of the elections because the elections are democratic, elections are one of the solutions to bring people back to peace, but they can also be a new source of crisis if we do not manage to make them democratic, transparent and credible." A month prior to the elections, Kamoun installed a night time curfew amid rising tensions and violence in the capital Bangui. Following the election, the newly elected President Faustin-Archange Touadéra named Simplice Sarandji as Kamoun's replacement as Prime Minister on 2 April 2016.

References

1961 births
Boston University alumni
Central African Republic Muslims
Living people
People from Bamingui-Bangoran
Prime Ministers of the Central African Republic